Agnes Betty Jeffrey, OAM (14 May 1908 – 13 September 2000) was an Australian writer who wrote about her Second World War nursing experiences in the book White Coolies.

Life
Jeffrey was a nurse in the 2/10th Australian General Hospital during World War II; she was taken captive by the Japanese Imperial Army and interned in the Dutch East Indies. While in the Japanese internment camp on Sumatra, Jeffrey joined the female vocal orchestra. Betty Jeffrey was freed and returned home on October 24, 1945. She partnered with another former prisoner to open the Melbourne Nurses Memorial Centre in 1949 to honor the heroism of nurses. She later wrote about her experiences in the book White Coolies, which partially inspired the film Paradise Road and the 1955 Australian radio series White Coolies
.  Margaret Dryburgh, Vivian Bullwinkel and Wilma Oram were fellow internees with Jeffrey.

Works
 White Coolies, Betty Jeffrey, Eden Paperbacks, Sydney, 1954

References

Further reading

}
 Biography of Betty Jeffrey
 
 
 

1908 births
2000 deaths
Australian nurses
Female wartime nurses
Military history of Australia during World War II
Australian Army personnel of World War II
Australian women in World War II
Women in the Australian military
World War II prisoners of war held by Japan
20th-century Australian writers
20th-century Australian women writers
World War II nurses
Australian prisoners of war
Australian women nurses
Australian Army officers
People from Hobart